Acute pericarditis is a type of pericarditis (inflammation of the sac surrounding the heart, the pericardium) usually lasting less than 6 weeks. It is the most common condition affecting the pericardium.

Signs and symptoms

Chest pain is one of the common symptoms of acute pericarditis. It is usually of sudden onset, occurring in the anterior chest and often has a sharp quality that worsens with breathing in or coughing, due to inflammation of the pleural surface at the same time. The pain may be reduced with sitting up and leaning forward while worsened with lying down, and also may radiate to the back, to one or both trapezius ridges. However, the pain can also be dull and steady, resembling the chest pain in an acute myocardial infarction. As with any chest pain, other causes must also be ruled out, such as GERD, pulmonary embolism, muscular pain, etc.

A pericardial friction rub is a very specific sign of acute pericarditis, meaning the presence of this sign invariably indicates presence of disease. However, absence of this sign does not rule out disease. This rub can be best heard by the diaphragm of the stethoscope at the left sternal border arising as a squeaky or scratching sound, resembling the sound of leather rubbing against each other. This sound should be distinguished from the sound of a murmur, which is similar but sounds more like a "swish" sound than a scratching sound. The pericardial rub is said to be generated from the friction generated by the two inflamed layers of the pericardium; however, even a large pericardial effusion does not necessarily present a rub. The rub is best heard during the maximal movement of the heart within the pericardial sac, namely, during atrial systole, ventricular systole, and the filling phase of early ventricular diastole.

Fever may be present since this is an inflammatory process.

Causes
There are several causes of acute pericarditis. In developed nations, the cause of most (80–90%) cases of acute pericarditis is unknown but a viral cause is suspected in the majority of such cases. The other 10–20% of acute pericarditis cases have various causes including connective tissue diseases (e.g., systemic lupus erythematosus), cancer, or involve an inflammatory reaction of the pericardium following trauma to the heart such as after a heart attack such as Dressler's syndrome. Familial mediterranean fever and TNF receptor associated periodic syndrome are rare inherited autoimmune diseases capable of causing recurring episodes of acute pericarditis.

Pathophysiology
Clinical presentation of diseases of pericardium may vary between:
 Acute and recurrent pericarditis
 Pericardial effusion without major hemodynamic compromise
 Cardiac tamponade
 Constrictive pericarditis
 Effusive-constrictive pericarditis

Diagnosis

For acute pericarditis to formally be diagnosed, two or more of the following criteria must be present: chest pain consistent with a diagnosis of acute pericarditis (sharp chest pain worsened by breathing in or a cough), a pericardial friction rub, a pericardial effusion, and changes on electrocardiogram (ECG) consistent with acute pericarditis.

A complete blood count may show an elevated white count and a serum C-reactive protein may be elevated. Acute pericarditis is associated with a modest increase in serum creatine kinase MB (CK-MB). and cardiac troponin I (cTnI), both of which are also markers for injury to the muscular layer of the heart. Therefore, it is imperative to also rule out acute myocardial infarction in the face of these biomarkers. The elevation of these substances may occur when inflammation of the heart's muscular layer in addition to acute pericarditis. Also, ST elevation on EKG (see below) is more common in those patients with a cTnI > 1.5 µg/L. Coronary angiography in those patients should indicate normal vascular perfusion. Troponin levels increase in 35-50% of people with pericarditis.

Electrocardiogram (ECG) changes in acute pericarditis mainly indicates inflammation of the epicardium (the layer directly surrounding the heart), since the fibrous pericardium is electrically inert. For example, in uremia, there is no inflammation in the epicardium, only fibrin deposition, and therefore the EKG in uremic pericarditis will be normal. Typical EKG changes in acute pericarditis includes
 stage 1 -- diffuse, positive, ST elevations with reciprocal ST depression in aVR and V1. Elevation of PR segment in aVR and depression of PR in other leads especially left heart V5, V6 leads indicates atrial injury.
 stage 2 -- normalization of ST and PR deviations
 stage 3 -- diffuse T wave inversions (may not be present in all patients)
 stage 4 -- EKG becomes normal OR T waves may be indefinitely inverted

The two most common clinical conditions where ECG findings may mimic pericarditis are acute myocardial infarction (AMI) and generalized early repolarization. As opposed to pericarditis, AMI usually causes localized convex ST-elevation usually associated with reciprocal ST-depression which may also be frequently accompanied by Q-waves, T-wave inversions (while ST is still elevated unlike pericarditis), arrhythmias and conduction abnormalities. In AMI, PR-depressions are rarely present. Early repolarization usually occurs in young males (age <40 years) and ECG changes are characterized by terminal R-S slurring, temporal stability of ST-deviations and J-height/ T-amplitude ratio in V5 and V6 of <25% as opposed to pericarditis where terminal R-S slurring is very uncommon and J-height/ T-amplitude ratio is ≥ 25%. Very rarely, ECG changes in hypothermia may mimic pericarditis, however differentiation can be helpful by a detailed history and presence of an Osborne wave in hypothermia.

Another important diagnostic electrocardiographic sign in acute pericarditis is the Spodick sign. It signifies to the PR-depressions in a usual (but not always) association with downsloping TP segment in patients with acute pericarditis and is present in up to 80% of the patients affected with acute pericarditis. The sign is often best visualized in lead II and lateral precordial leads. In addition, Spodick's sign may also serve as an important distinguishing electrocardiographic tool between the acute pericarditis and acute coronary syndrome. The presence of a classical Spodick's sign is often a giveaway to the diagnosis.

Rarely, electrical alternans may be seen, depending on the size of the effusion.

A chest x-ray is usually normal in acute pericarditis but can reveal the presence of an enlarged heart if a pericardial effusion is present and is greater than 200 mL in volume. Conversely, patients with unexplained new onset cardiomegaly should always be worked up for acute pericarditis.

An echocardiogram is typically normal in acute pericarditis but can reveal pericardial effusion, the presence of which supports the diagnosis, although its absence does not exclude the diagnosis.

Treatment
Patients with uncomplicated acute pericarditis can generally be treated and followed up in an outpatient clinic. However, those with high risk factors for developing complications (see above) will need to be admitted to an inpatient service, most likely an ICU setting. High risk patients include the following:
 subacute onset
 high fever (> 100.4 F/38 C) and leukocytosis
 development of cardiac tamponade
 large pericardial effusion (echo-free space > 20 mm) resistant to NSAID treatment
 immunocompromised
 history of oral anticoagulation therapy
 acute trauma
 failure to respond to seven days of NSAID treatment

Pericardiocentesis is a procedure whereby the fluid in a pericardial effusion is removed through a needle. It is performed under the following conditions:
 presence of moderate or severe cardiac tamponade
 diagnostic purpose for suspected purulent, tuberculosis, or neoplastic pericarditis
 persistent symptomatic pericardial effusion

NSAIDs in viral or idiopathic pericarditis. In patients with underlying causes other than viral, the specific etiology should be treated. With idiopathic or viral pericarditis, NSAID is the mainstay treatment. Goal of therapy is to reduce pain and inflammation. The course of the disease may not be affected. The preferred NSAID is ibuprofen because of rare side effects, better effect on coronary flow, and larger dose range. Depending on severity, dosing is between 300 and 800 mg every 6–8 hours for days or weeks as needed. An alternative protocol is aspirin 800 mg every 6–8 hours. Dose tapering of NSAIDs may be needed. In pericarditis following acute myocardial infarction, NSAIDs other than aspirin should be avoided since they can impair scar formation. As with all NSAID use, GI protection should be engaged. Failure to respond to NSAIDs within one week (indicated by persistence of fever, worsening of condition, new pericardial effusion, or continuing chest pain) likely indicates that a cause other than viral or idiopathic is in process.

Colchicine, which has been essential to treat recurrent pericarditis, has been supported for routine use in acute pericarditis by recent prospective studies. Colchicine can be given 0.6 mg twice a day (0.6 mg daily for patients <70 kg) for 3 months following an acute attack. It should be considered in all patients with acute pericarditis, preferably in combination with a short-course of NSAIDs. For patients with a first episode of acute idiopathic or viral pericarditis, they should be treated with an NSAID plus colchicine 1–2 mg on first day followed by 0.5 daily or twice daily for three months. It should be avoided or used with caution in patients with severe chronic kidney disease, hepatobiliary dysfunction, blood dyscrasias, and gastrointestinal motility disorders.

Corticosteroids are usually used in those cases that are clearly refractory to NSAIDs and colchicine and a specific cause has not been found. Systemic corticosteroids are usually reserved for those with autoimmune disease.

Prognosis
One of the most feared complications of acute pericarditis is cardiac tamponade. Cardiac tamponade is accumulation of enough fluid in the pericardial space --- pericardial effusion --- to cause serious obstruction to the inflow of blood to the heart. Signs of cardiac tamponade include distended neck veins, muffled heart sounds when listening with a stethoscope, and low blood pressure (together known as Beck's triad). This condition can be fatal if not immediately treated.

Another longer term complication of pericarditis, if it recurs over a longer period of time (normally more than 3 months), is progression to constrictive pericarditis. Recent studies have shown this to be an uncommon complication. The definitive treatment for constrictive pericarditis is pericardial stripping, which is a surgical procedure where the entire pericardium is peeled away from the heart.

References

Further reading

External links 

Pericardial disorders
Medical terminology
Enterovirus-associated diseases
Herpes simplex virus–associated diseases

ja:心膜炎#急性心膜炎